Israel Ifeanyi is a former American Football defensive end who played for the San Francisco 49ers and San Diego Chargers. He had a career-ending knee injury during training camp, cutting his career short as it was on the rise. Subsequently, he went on to coach high school football for 10 years, and was the head coach for eight years at Desert Christian High School in Lancaster, CA, where he started the program and made the playoffs during several seasons. 

During his collegiate career at USC he wore the famous #55 and was a collegiate All-American and defensive captain of the 1996 Champion Rose Bowl Game.

References

1970 births
Living people
American football defensive ends
Nigerian players of American football
USC Trojans football players
San Francisco 49ers players
Sportspeople from Lagos